Alveolar pressure (Palv) is the pressure of air inside the lung alveoli. When the glottis is opened and no air is flowing into or out of the lungs, alveolar pressure is equal to the atmospheric pressure, that is, zero cmH2O.

Significance
During inhalation, the increased volume of alveoli as a result of lung expansion decreases the intra-alveolar pressure to a value below atmospheric pressure about -1 cmH2O. This slight negative pressure is enough to move 500 ml of air into the lungs in the 2 seconds required for inspiration. At the end of inspiration, the alveolar pressure returns to atmospheric pressure (zero cmH2O).

During exhalation, the opposite change occurs. The lung alveoli collapse before air is expelled from them. The alveolar pressure rises to about +1 cmH2O. This forces the 500 ml of inspired air out of the lung during the 2–3 seconds of expiration. By the end of expiration, the pressure drops gradually and becomes atmospheric again.

References

Respiratory therapy
Pulmonology
Mechanical ventilation